Uncle Brian is a Canadian 2010 comedy-drama film directed by Nick McAnulty and starring Daniel MacLean in the title role.

The film premiered at the 2010 New York City International Film Festival where it was honoured with two award nominations including for Best Feature Film, and winning the Best Lead Actor award for Daniel MacLean.

Reviews
Quiet Earth

References

External links

2010 films
Canadian comedy-drama films
2010 comedy-drama films
English-language Canadian films
2010s English-language films
2010s Canadian films